Massimiliano Frezzato (born March 12, 1967) is an Italian comic book author.

Born in Turin, he studied art in that city and won the first Prize in the 1989 comics contest in Prato. In 1990 he started the series Margot, written by Jerome Charyn.

His most famous work is I custodi del Maser (Keepers of the Maser), which appeared in 1996 and has been translated in numerous countries, including France, Belgium, Portugal, United States, Germany, Poland and Denmark.

Frezzato's influences include Moebius, Enki Bilal, Tanino Liberatore, Hayao Miyazaki and Katsuhiro Ōtomo.

Bibliography

English translations
Hardcover editions by Heavy Metal
 Keepers of the Maser Series:
 Second Moon (52 pages, 1997)
 Isle of Dwarves (64 pages, 1998)
 Eye of the Sea (1999)
 The Iron Tower (2000)
 The Edge of the World (64 pages, 2003)
 The Lost Village (52 pages, 2005)
 The Young Queen (script by Massimiliano Frezzato, art by Fabio Ruotolo) (2007)
 Other works:
 Frezzato Sketchbooks (46 pages, 2002)

Works published in Heavy Metal Magazine (including special issues)
 Longer stories:
 Margot: Queen Of The Night (Jerome Charyn and Massimiliano Frezzato) (63 pages, 1995-Overdrive Special - Vol. 9 No. 1)
 The Keepers Of The Maser (1): The Second Moon (Massimiliano Frezzato) (44 pages, 1997-March - Vol. 21 No. 1)
 The Keepers Of The Maser 2: The Isle of Dwarves (44 pages, 1998-Spring special - Vol. 12 No. 1)
 The Keepers Of The Maser: Kolony: The Essential Survival Guide (44 pages, 1998-Spring special - Vol. 12 No. 1)
 The Keepers Of The Maser 3: Eye Of The Sea (Massimiliano Frezzato and Nikita Mandryka) (44 pages, 1999-July - Vol. 22 No. 3)
 The Keepers Of The Maser 4: The Iron Tower (Massimiliano Frezzato and Nikita Mandryka) (44 pages, 2000-November - Vol. 24 No. 5)
 The Keepers Of The Maser 5: The Edge Of The World (Massimiliano Frezzato and Nikita Mandryka) (44 pages, 2003-May - Vol. 27 No. 2)
 The Keepers Of The Maser 6: The Lost Village (Massimiliano Frezzato and Nikita Mandryka) (51 pages, 2005-September - Vol. 29 No. 4)
 The Keepers Of The Maser 7: The Young Queen (Massimiliano Frezzato and Fabio Ruotolo) (44 pages, 2007-Spring special - Vol. 21 No. 1)
 Short stories
 Dear Enemy (9 pages, 1996 - January - Vol. 19 No. 6)
 The Pleasure Of Love (5 pages, 1996 - November - Vol. 20 No. 5)
 Pee Pee (4 pages, 1996 - November - Vol. 20 No. 5)
 Dog Face (5 pages, 1997 - May - Vol. 21 No. 2)
 The Last Resource (3 pages, 1997 - 20 Years - Fall Special - Vol. 11 No. 2)
 Tip-In Series No. 17 (1 page, 2004 - May - Vol. 28 No. 2)

Wolverine annual 1999
 Artwork for the second story, Beer Run, written by Marc Andreyko.

Notes

External links
 Official homepage
 Comiclopedia

1967 births
Living people
Italian cartoonists
Writers from Turin
Artists from Turin